The 1987 Dacorum Borough Council election took place on 7 May 1987 to elect members of the Dacorum Borough Council in England. It was held on the same day as other local elections.

Election result

|}

References

1987 English local elections
May 1987 events in the United Kingdom
1987
1980s in Hertfordshire